The Flemish Cycling Week (Dutch:Vlaamse Wielerweek) or simply Flemish Week, is a series of five road cycling races held in Flanders in late March and early April.

The series span in fact two weeks. It begins with Dwars door Vlaanderen (until 2017) and ends 11–12 days later with the Tour of Flanders, which is the most important race of the series.

Events
Since 2018, the series consist of five one-day races:
 Three Days of De Panne, originally until 2017 held as stage race from Tuesday to Thursday in the same week as the Tour of Flanders
 E3 Harelbeke, on Friday or Saturday of the week before the Tour of Flanders
 Gent–Wevelgem, on Sunday before the Tour of Flanders
 Dwars door Vlaanderen, until 2017 held on Wednesday of the week before the Tour of Flanders, since 2018 in the same week
 Tour of Flanders, a final race of the series

Originally the Brabantse Pijl was part of the Flemish Cycling Week as it was run the Sunday before the Tour of Flanders, but in 2010 it was rescheduled to a later date, because the race course was more suitable for riders participating in the Ardennes classics. The gap in the calendar was filled by Gent-Wevelgem, which used to be held on the Wednesday after the Tour of Flanders.

Winners (since 1990)

From 1990 till 2009

From 2010 till 2017

From 2018
In 2018, multi-stage race Three Days of De Panne was rebranded as one-day race Three Days of Bruges–De Panne and moved to mid-March.

See also
 Tour of Flanders for Women

References

External links

Cycle races in Belgium
Sport in Flanders
1958 establishments in Belgium

Recurring sporting events established in 1958